Ronald Wood (1929–1990) was an English cricketer.

Ronald Wood may also refer to:

Ronald Karslake Starr Wood (1919–2017), British plant pathologist
Ronnie Wood (born 1947), English musician, member of The Rolling Stones. Wood is also a full partner in the Rolling Stones' financial organisation.
Ronnie Wood (ice hockey) (born 1960), Scottish ice hockey player
Ronald McKinnon Wood (1892–1967), Labour Member of London County Council

See also
Ronald Woods (disambiguation)